The Volchina is a river in Vyshnevolotsky, Udomelsky, and Maksatikhinsky Districts of Tver Oblast in Russia. It is a left tributary of the Mologa. The main tributaries are the Tifina (left) and the Vorozhba (right).

The source of the Volchina is Lake Volchino, shared between Udomelsky (north) and Vyshnevolotsky (south) districts. The outflow of the Volchina is located in Udomelsky District. The river flows northwest, flows in Lake Rogozino, flows out in the southern direction and enters Vyshnevolotsky District. In the village of Ovsishche it turns east, flows to the boundary between the districts and makes a stretch of the boundary, and flows in Lake Perkhovo. From the lake, the Volchina flows east, crosses again into Udomelsky District, makes a stretch of the border between Udomelsky and Maksatikhinsky District, and continues into Maksatikhinsky District. Its mouth is downstream of the urban-type settlement of Maksatikha.

The whole course of the Volchina is heavily populated.

The drainage basin of the Volchina is located in the center of Tver Oblast and is split between seven districts: Udomelsky, Vyshnevolotsky, Spirovsky, Likhoslavlsky, Rameshkovsky, Bezhetsky, and Maksatikhinsky. In particular, the area contains a large number of lakes.

References

Rivers of Tver Oblast